Louis Godart (born 12 August 1945) is an Italian archaeologist of Belgian origins. He is a specialist in Mycenaean archaeology and philology and holds the chair of philology at the University of Naples Federico II. He is also currently Director for the Conservation of Artistic Heritage of the Italian President.

Studies
Godart was born  in  Bourseigne-Vieille. After attending middle and high school at the Collège de Bellevue in Dinant in Belgium until 1963, he graduated in classical philology  in 1967 at the University of Louvain. In 1971 he got a PhD in literature and philosophy at the Free University of Brussels and, in 1977, another doctorate in arts and humanities at the Sorbonne in Paris.

Godart researched on the Mycenaean Linear B tablets and, in general, on the Aegean writing. In 1982 he started the Mission site in Minoan Archaeology Apodoulou, Crete, a joint program of the University of Naples Federico II and the Greek Ministry of Culture, co-directed with Yannis Tzedakis, former Director General of Antiquities of Greece. He has organized several national and international conferences in archaeological and philological on protohistoric Mediterranean, including the Micenologia II International Congress in Naples in 1992.

He is the author of 29 books and 141 scientific articles, published in Italy and abroad on topics relating to the civilizations of the Mediterranean, especially the Aegean civilization.

See also
Phaistos Disc

External links
Biography at the University of Naples

1945 births
Living people
Italian archaeologists
Belgian archaeologists
People from Namur (province)